(English: Wednesday from Light) is an opera by Karlheinz Stockhausen in a greeting, four scenes, and a farewell. It was the sixth of seven to be composed for the opera cycle  (Light: The Seven Days of the Week), and the last to be staged. It was written between 1995 and 1997, and first staged in 2012.

History

The four component scenes were separately commissioned and premiered:
 Welt-Parlament (World Parliament) was commissioned by the South German Radio Stuttgart and was composed from 29 December 1994 to 5 March 1995.
 Orchester-Finalisten (Orchestra Finalists) was commissioned by Jan van Vlijmen, director of the Holland Festival, and was premiered on 14 June 1996, at the Carré Theatre, Amsterdam, by the Asko Ensemble.
 Helikopter-Streichquartett (Helicopter String Quartet) was premiered by the Arditti Quartet and the Grasshoppers on 26 June 1995 in Amsterdam, as part of the Holland Festival. Performed "fairly regularly" since its premiere, it has become "the most iconic piece of classical music from the 1990s".
 Michaelion was composed in 1997 on a commission from Udo Zimmermann for the Musica Viva concert series of the Bavarian Radio, Munich. The score is dedicated to the Archangel Michael. It was premiered on 26 July 1998 in the Prinzregententheater, Munich (Musica Viva series) by the Choir of the South German Radio, conducted by Rupert Huber, with Kathinka Pasveer (flute), Michael Vetter (bass with short-wave receiver), Andreas Fischer (bass), Suzanne Stephens (basset horn), Marco Blaauw (trumpet), Andrew Digby (trombone), Antonio Pérez Abellán (synthesizer), and Natascha Nikeprelevic (camel assistant).

The staged premiere of Mittwoch was given by the Birmingham Opera Company on what would have been the composer's 84th birthday, Wednesday 22 August 2012 at the Argyle Works, a former factory in Digbeth, Birmingham, as part of the London 2012 Festival, with further performances on 23, 24, and 25 August. The director was Graham Vick, music director Kathinka Pasveer, designer Paul Brown, lighting Giuseppe di Iorio, and choreography Ron Howell. The production went on to win the 2012 Royal Philharmonic Society Award for Opera and Music Theatre.

Roles (staged premiere)

Synopsis

Wednesday is the day of cooperation and reconciliation among Michael, Eve, and Lucifer, and its exoteric colour is bright yellow. The following list of 24 "scenic features" of the whole opera is found in the preface to the score of its final scene:
 Light spirits: Eve, Michael, and Lucifer
 Divine principles: intuition and harmony
 Theme: love, friendship, and cosmic solidarity
 Ritual: beauty and art
 Beings: humans and the guardian angel Raphael
 Element: air
 Sound: singing
 Voices: soprano, tenor, and bass
 Instruments: basset horn with flute, trumpet, trombone
 Organ: brain, speech organ
 Sense: sight (especially the right eye), pure reason
 Centre: between the eyes, face, clairvoyance
 Awareness: understanding, vision, spiritual comprehension
 Colour: bright yellow, iridescence of all colours.
 Scents: mastic and frankincense
 Precious stones: yellow zircon, topaz
 Metal: mercury
 Flower: golden yellow rudbeckia
 Shrub: forsythia
 Tree: maple, Japanese maples
 Animals: dove, camel
 Number: 8
 Planet: Mercury
 Symbol: 

Mittwoch is in four scenes, which are preceded by a greeting and followed by a farewell.

Mittwochs-Gruß
The Wednesday Greeting consists of the electronic music from the fourth scene, Michaelion, and is played in the foyer amidst flues, winds, blowers, kites, balloons, and flying doves.

Scene 1: Welt-Parlament

The World Parliament convenes in a session above the clouds, and the subject for debate is love. As the parliamentarians arrive via transparent elevators at the top floor of the skyscraper or floating glass dome, helicopters and doves occasionally pass by in the blue sky beyond. The debate is carried on in unknown languages, with occasional lapses into intelligibility in the local language. Delegates rise to present their interpretations of love, with the President commenting on each view. When a janitor interrupts with the news that an illegally parked car is about to be towed away, the President realises it is his, and rushes out. A coloratura soprano is elected temporary President, and the debate is continued. After a final large vowel spiral, the parliamentarians synchronously
declare the central theme of the opera: "World parliament Wednesday from Light, day of reconciliation, love". The session is adjourned, all rise and exit while singing further attributes of Wednesday ("day of spaces", "day of women's rights", "day of Mercury", "day of reconciliation", "day of flying", "day of new languages", etc.) on a G. Unsure where he should exit, the fattest bass stops, turns to the audience in embarrassment, and before leaving stutters, "Now the next scene would follow".

Scene 2: Orchester-Finalisten

Eleven instrumentalists compete for posts in an orchestra, while floating high in the air. Telescopic observation reveals a variety of airborne scenes: a cathedral roof, aeroplanes flying over the sea, ships in a harbour, etc. In the last solo, the double-bass player becomes convulsed in an obsessive-compulsive fit of scraping and groaning, until the appearance of the mysterious figure of a mummy who, with a stroke on a Chinese gong, releases the bassist from his affliction. After all auditions have been completed, a horn player unexpectedly enters the hall, playing a signal, after which all of the players fly upward in a tutti finale.

The solos are accompanied by electronic and concrete music in octophonic spatial projection, and each is associated with a particular image:

Oboe above a cathedral
Violoncello over an airport by the sea
Clarinet above a harbour with passing aircraft
Bassoon over a train pulled by a steam locomotive
Violin above a bird reserve
Tuba amongst flocks of birds and swarms of bees
Flute above a kindergarten with small goats
Trombone above a swimming pool with elephants
Viola flying with wild geese over a railway station
Trumpet over a Marrakech market-place, with zebras, lions, wild geese, and horses
Contrabass above a sailing ship, with tree frogs and a beat up car
Horn
Orchestral Tutti

Scene 3: Helikopter-Streichquartett

The four musicians of a string quartet are first introduced to the audience by a moderator, who describes the technical details of the performance. The players then walk or are driven to four waiting helicopters, followed by video cameras transmitting back to television monitors in the auditorium.

They are then carried into the air by the helicopters, from where they play a synchronized, polyphonic composition while reacting to the sounds of the rotor blades. Their playing is also influenced by the movements chosen by the pilots. From time to time their playing comes together in the same rhythms and bowings, even though it is plain they are isolated and kilometers apart. Video cameras and microphones transmit their images (including views through the glass cockpits of the world below) and sounds to four towers of video monitors and loudspeakers in the auditorium on the ground.

After returning to the ground and concluding the composition, the musicians and pilots disembark and return to the auditorium, still followed by the video cameras. Once in the auditorium, the moderator introduces the pilots to the audience, and asks players and pilots about their experiences. Questions are also taken from the audience.

Scene 4: Michaelion
The Michaelion is a galactic headquarters where a meeting of delegates from different stars has been called in order to elect a new President. He or she must be a "galaxy operator" who can translate universal messages no one else can understand. The scene consists of three sub-scenes.

Präsidium
As the delegates arrive, the word goes round that the favourite candidate is named Lucicamel. In the auditorium, someone is listening to a short-wave radio, occasionally mimicking the sounds. After a while, he leaves.

Luzikamel
Lucicamel, who is a Bactrian camel, arrives accompanied by a trombonist dressed in white, and is greeted by the delegates. In a series of events, he presents himself to the assembly.
 "Kakabel". Lucicamel sings of Camael, the angel of the seven planets, and defecates seven differently coloured planet globes, "which emphasize MICHAEL'S light for the seven days of the week". Not all of the delegates are favourably impressed.
 "Shoe-Shine Serenade". Two tenors polish Lucicamel's left fore hoof until it shines like gold, while two other tenors do the same with his left hind hoof.
 "Pocket Trick". Lucicamel turns around and abruptly sticks one hoof into his pocket. Two tenor delegates entice him away with a large bottle of champagne and he nearly leaves, but is stopped and brought back by two altos.

 "Camel Dance". A little tipsy, Lucicamel and his trombone assistant dance, while he sings the names of stars and sneers at "Sirius philistines who say that Lucicameltrombonut are not musical". The delegates chuckle and make ironic and humorous comments.
 "Bullfight". Trombonut plays the part of a matador and Lucicamel plays the bull, while the delegates clap and cheer them on. Lucicamel wins, and sits down on the fallen trombonist while a podium is brought in and the women unzip the camel costume. From it emerges Luca, wearing a Zen monk's cape. He is brought a yellow robe, mask, and high, pointed hat. He is acclaimed as President and Operator, and takes his place on the podium.

Operator
As Michael's Operator, Luca listens to broadcasts received on a short-wave radio in order to provide reports in response to problems successively posed by eleven delegates, who imitate him, poorly but humorously.
 Thinki. An alto delegate's question (in German) is accompanied by a flautist in an ornate cadenza, and the Operator replies (in English), that "Leo lion galaxies ask Michael if God wants Michael, Eve, Lucifer to work together for cosmic solidarity".

 Bassetsu Trio (Carousel). Trombonut and the trumpeter are now joined by a basset-horn player. Together they play and dance in a stylized, rotating choreography as the choir receives instruction from the Operator in various styles of singing and languages (Noh, Kabuki, American, Russian, Swedish, Italian, Kölsch, French, Zulu, Bavarian, Greek, Dutch, North German, and Chinese). A soprano from the choir sings about her home, the sun of planet Earth—"terra magica"—describing moments from Orchester-Finalisten ("I see oboes above cathedrals, I see a cello gently floating above an airport by the sea ..."). The tenors enter slowly, each holding a small book and softly singing the text "Litanei" from Stockhausen's 1968 composition cycle Aus den sieben Tagen.
 "Menschen, hört" ("Mankind, Hear")—Space-Sextet. The delegates are sent out to the distant corners of the universe. Six of them are each presented with one of the planet-globes to take along, and come out into the auditorium to sing a concluding sextet as they rotate clockwise around the audience. As they leave the hall, the Operator is alone on the stage and gradually fades from sight, still transforming short-wave sounds, until only the nocturnal firmament is left shining above.

Mittwochs-Abschied

The Wednesday Farewell is the electronic music from scene 2 which, like the electronic music for act 2 of Dienstag, is projected octophonically through speakers arranged at the corners of a cube surrounding the audience. Here, however, it is played "beyond mirrored visions", in the form of video projections of the eleven space-events of Orchester-Finalisten, in the foyer as the audience departs.

Press reception (staged premiere)
The premiere performances were sold out. The venue's capacity was 500 with the audience moving between the two massive halls of Argyle Works. Birmingham Opera Company fielded a 100 strong acting company of "Vick's wonderful army of talented volunteers", a trademark of the company, who performed alongside the singers and instrumentalists, and sometimes also amongst the audience, "holding the fulcrum between humour and mystery on which the whole production was so skilfully balanced". Writing in the Frankfurter Allgemeine Zeitung, Jörn Florian Fuchs cited Kathinka Pasveer's musical direction as a "truly brilliant realization of the score". Agreeing with this assessment of Pasveer's accomplishment, David Fallows added that "one of the important details of any live performance of Stockhausen has always been the sheer gorgeousness of the sound projection, making its impact right from the first moments of the magically lucid Wednesday Greeting". Anna Picard concluded in The Independent that it was an "unhurried, ecstatic promenade production" and that "Stockhausen's dream was realised wittily and lovingly".

Rupert Christiansen gave the production 4 out of 5 stars in The Telegraph, but he dismissed its third scene Helicopter String Quartet which he felt was "a banal gimmick, wasting an obscene amount of money and fuel to generate only a hideous amount of pointless noise". Christiansen cited Stockhausen's "bonkers sense of humour" as "a saving grace" of the production. Nick Richardson, writing in the London Review of Books, disagreed about the Helicopter Quartet, describing it as "fantastic on Thursday night, particularly at take-off, the strings' vigorous tremolos locking with the throb of the rotor blades and the warm, bass hum of engine".

Gisela Schwarz wrote in the Kölner Stadt-Anzeiger that Graham Vick had ably captured Stockhausen's diverse religious views without dismissing them as merely esoteric. Stephen Pritchard's review for The Observer concluded that the production was "undoubtedly" worth the reported £920,000 expense of the production:

Mark Swed summed up his view of the production in the Los Angeles Times by writing, "the event was astonishing for the soul and simply beyond belief".

Auxiliary works
In addition to the opera itself, various parts of which may be performed separately, there are four independent pieces made in different ways from versions of the Mittwoch formula:
 Europa-Gruss, Nr. 72, for winds (1992/1995/2002), originally conceived as the "greeting" for Mittwoch but replaced with the electronic music from Michaelion
 Trumpetent, Nr. 73, for four trumpets (1995)
 Mittwoch-Formel, Nr. 73½, for percussion trio (2004)
 Klavierstück XVIII (Mittwoch-Formel), Nr. 73⅔, for synthesizer (2004)

Gallery

Discography
No integral recording of Mittwoch aus Licht has yet been released, although all of the components have now appeared. The SWR broadcast the whole opera in October 2003 using selections from the first six of the following CD releases plus the 1998 Bayerischer Rundfunk recording of the dress rehearsal of Michaelion.

 Mittwochs-Gruß. Antonio Pérez Abellán (synthesizer). Karlheinz Stockhausen (realisation). Stockhausen Complete Edition, CD 66. Kürten: Stockhausen-Verlag, 2003.
 Welt-Parlament. Südfunk Chor Stuttgart, Rupert Huber (cond.); Karlheinz Stockhausen (sound projection). Stockhausen Complete Edition CD 51. Kürten: Stockhausen-Verlag, 1996.
 Orchester Finalisten. Asko Ensemble, Amsterdam; Karlheinz Stockhausen (sound projection). Stockhausen Complete Edition CD 49. Kürten: Stockhausen-Verlag, 1997.
 Helikopter-Streichquartett: Uraufführung 1995 + Studioproduktion 1996. Arditti String Quartet (Irvine Arditti, Graeme Jennings [world premiere] and David Alberman [studio recording of the revised score], violins; Garth Knox, viola; Rohan de Saram, cello); "The Grasshoppers" (helicopter acrobatic team); Karlheinz Stockhausen, musical direction, recording supervision, sound projection, mix-down, and moderation [of the world premiere]. Stockhausen Complete Edition, Compact Disc 53 A-B (2 CDs). Kürten: Stockhausen-Verlag, 1999. Studio version also released on Montaigne Auvidis MO 782097 (CD).
 Helikopter-Streichquartett. Arditti String Quartet (Irvine Arditti & David Alberman, violins; Garth Knox, viola; Rohan de Saram, cello); "The Grasshoppers" (helicopter acrobatic team, recording from the third Amsterdam performance, mixed in). Arditti Quartet Edition 35. Montaigne Auvidis MO 782097 (single CD). Paris: Montaigne Auvidis, 1999.
 Bassetsu-Trio and Mittwochs Abschied. Suzanne Stephens (basset horn); Marco Blaauw (trumpet); Andrew Digby (trombone). Stockhausen Complete Edition, CD 55. Kürten: Stockhausen-Verlag, 2000.
 Vibra-Elufa for vibraphone, Komet for a percussionist and electronic and concrete music; Nasenflugeltanz from Samstag aus Licht for a percussionist and synthesizer; Klavierstück XVIII for synthesizer; Mittwoch Formel for 3 percussionists. Stockhausen Complete Edition CD 79. Kürten: Stockhausen-Verlag, 2005.
 Michaels-Ruf, Bassetsu for basset horn, Synthi-Fou, Quitt, Komet for a percussionist, Trumpetent. Markus Stockhausen, Andreas Adam, Marco Blaauw, Achim Gorsch (trumpets), Suzanne Stephens (clarinet and basset horn), Stuart Gerber (percussion), Antonio Pérez-Abellán (synthesizer), Kathinka Pasveer (alto flute) Stockhausen Complete Edition CD 82. Kürten: Stockhausen-Verlag, 2007.
Tara Bouman, Klarinette, Bassetthorn: Contemporary. Includes Klarinette aus Orchesterfinalisten from Mittwoch aus Licht. (CD) DeutschlandRadio Aktivraum AR 50101. Cologne: Aktivraum Musik, 2003.
Michaelion. Michael Leibundgut (bass); Chloé l'Abbé (flute); Fie Schouten (basset horn); Marco Blaauw (trumpet); Stephen Menotti (trombone); Antonio Pérez Abellán (synthesizer); London Voices (Terry Edwards and Ben Parry, co-directors; Nigel Short, Matthew Morley, and Gregory Rose, chorus masters); Kathinka Pasveer (sound projection). Recorded 13–15 August 2012, at the Argyle Works, Birmingham, UK. Stockhausen Complete Edition CD 54. Kürten: Stockhausen-Verlag, 2013.
Kamel-Tanz. Michael Leibundgut (bass), Stephen Menotti (trombone), tape prepared by Antonio Pérez Abellán, recorded 25 July 2013 at Sound Studio N, Cologne; Rotary Wind Quintet. Quintette Aquilon (Marion Ralincourt, flute; Claire Sirjacobs, oboe; Stéphanie Corre, clarinet; Marianne Tilquin, horn; Gaêlle Habert, bassoon), recorded12 August 2014 at Sound Studio N, Cologne. With In Freundschaft for oboe; Linker Augentanz; Taurus; Taurus-Quintett. CD recording, 1 disc: digital, 12 cm, stereo. Stockhausen Complete Edition CD 105. Kürten: Stockhausen-Verlag, 2015.

Filmography

 Helicopter String Quartet, a film by Frank Scheffer. Close-up: documentaireserie waarin Frank Scheffer zijn visie geeft op diverse 20e-eeuwse componisten. [S.l.]: AVRO. Televisie-opname, 1995.
German DVD release (German and English, DVD) Helicopter String Quartet. Frank Scheffer; Karlheinz Stockhausen. Kürten, Germany: Stockhausen-Verlag, 2006.
London Helicopter String Quartet. Frank Scheffer; ; Karlheinz Stockhausen 2008, 1995. German Visual Material: Videorecording: DVD video 1 videodisc (77 min.) : sd., col. ; 4 3/4 in.
French DVD release. Helicopter String Quartet. Karlheinz Stockhausen; Frank Scheffer. 2008, 1995. Videorecording: DVD video 1 DVD-Video (113 Min. [error: 77 mins., like the others]) + 1 Begleitblatt. [Paris]: Idéale Audience International.
 Stockhausen: Helikopter Streichquartett. Sound Director: André Richard. a co-production with Red Bull & Salzburg Festival. Bernhard Fleischer Moving Images, 2003. (Archive from 8 September 2012, accessed 23 July 2018.)
 Stockhausen, Michaelion, scene 4 from Mittwoch aus Licht. Colour film by Suzanne Stephens. 59 minutes. (Archive No. 109 / 1). Live recording of the world première on July 26, 1998 in Munich at the Prinzregenten Theatre with the Choir of the South German Radio (conductor: Rupert Huber), Michael Vetter (short-wave singer), Kathinka Pasveer (flute), Suzanne Stephens (basset-horn), Marco Blaauw (trumpet), and Andrew Digby (trombone). Kürten: Stockhausen-Verlag, 1998.

References

Cited sources

Further reading

 Ball, Timothy. 2012. "Stockhausen: MITTWOCH aus LICHT [Birmingham Opera Company; Graham Vick]". Classicalsource.com (accessed 1 September 2012).
 Berntsen, Frederike. 2010. "Spel van grote klasse: Stockhausen en Kagel naast elkaar". De Telegraaf (12 February): 13.
 Berry, Mark. 2012. "Stockhausen's Mittwoch, Birmingham". Opera Today (5 October) (accessed 20 October 2012).
 Boehmer, Konrad. 1998. "Ab in die Wolken mit Knattern ..." Neue Zeitschrift für Musik 159, no. 4 (July–August): 43–47.
 Boelen-Theile, Claus. 2012. "Kürten grüßt Birmingham". Kölnische Rundschau/Bergische Landeszeitung (16 August), Rundschau-online (accessed 1 September 2012).
 Brotbeck, Roman. 2012. "Ein Anfang! Zur szenischen Uraufführung von Stockhausens Mittwoch aus Licht". Dissonance: Schweizer Musikzeitschrift für Forschung und Kreation, no. 120 (December): 19–24.
 Cabral, Ismael G. 2012. "Karlheinz Stockhausen, MITTWOCH aus LICHT. Estreno: Birmingham Opera Company (22-08-2012)". Chorro de luz: Músicas avanzadas (25 August) (archive from 4 March 2016, accessed 23 July 2018).
 Chadburn, Leo. 2012. "The Unstageable Staged: Stockhausen's Mittwoch aus Licht Reviewed". The Quietus (31 August) (accessed 5 September 2012).
 Clements, Andrew. 1995. "Super Soaraway Stockhausen". The Guardian (29 June).
 Dirmeikis, Paul. 1999. Le Souffle du temps: Quodlibet pour Karlheinz Stockhausen. [La Seyne-sur-Mer]: Éditions Telo Martius. .
 Drew, Joseph. 2014. "Michael From Light: A Character Study of Karlheinz Stockhausen's Hero". Ph.D. diss. New York: New York University.
 Fairman, Richard. 2012. "Cue the Helicopter Quartet: Birmingham Opera Company Takes on Karlheinz Stockhausen's Mittwoch aus Licht". Financial Times (25 August). (Archive from 31 August 2012, accessed 23 July 2018.)
 Frei, Marco. 2012. "Karlheinz Stockhausen: Der Tag der Lüfte". Neue Zürcher Zeitung (24 August) (Accessed 1 September 2012).
 Frisius, Rudolf. 2013. Karlheinz Stockhausen III: Die Werkzyklen 1977–2007. Mainz, London, Berlin, Madrid, New York, Paris, Prague, Tokyo, Toronto: Schott Music. .
 Griffiths, Paul. 1995. "Stockhausen Has Lift-Off". The Times (July 5).
 Griffiths, Paul. 1996. "Stockhausen Rises and Falls on a Point of Order". The Times (7 February).
 Grohmann, Katerina. 2010. Karlheinz Stockhausen: Oper MITTWOCH aus LICHT. Kölner Beiträge zur Musikwissenschaft 12, edited by Christoph von Blumröder, Wolfram Steinbeck. Kassel: Bosse Verlag. .
 Gutknecht, Dieter. 1994. "Stockhausen: Helikopter-Streichquartett. Premiere Performance, 28 July, Salzburg, Mozarteum". Österreichische Musikzeitschrift 49, nos. 7–8 (July–August): 466–467.
 Hall, George. 2012. "Mittwoch". The Stage (23 August) (archive from 20 December 2014, accessed 23 July 2018).
 Hazendonk, Roeland. 2007. "Nostalgisch Stockhausen retrospectief". De Telegraaf (12 January): 17.
 Herbort, Heinz Josef. 1995. "Musik aus anderen Räumen". Die Zeit, no. 28 (7 July).
 Herbort, Heinz Josef. 1996. "Liebe im Unterhaus". Die Zeit, no. 7 (9 February).
 Koch, Gerhard R. 1998. "Schampus braucht das Trampeltier Stockhausen weiß-blau: Die Uraufführung von Michaelion im Münchener Prinzregententheater". Frankfurter Allgemeine Zeitung (28 July).
 Kohl, Jerome. 1990. "Into the Middleground: Formula Syntax in Stockhausen's Licht". Perspectives of New Music 28, no. 2 (Summer): 262–291.
 Kohl, Jerome. 2004. "Der Aspekt der Harmonik in Licht." In Internationales Stockhausen-Symposion 2000: LICHT. Musikwissenschaftliches Institut der Universität zu Köln, 19. bis 22. Oktober 2000. Tagungsbericht, edited by Imke Misch and Christoph von Blumröder, 116–132. Münster, Berlin, London: LIT-Verlag. .
 Kohl, Jerome. 2012. "A Gedenkschrift for Karlheinz Stockhausen: Guest Editor's Introduction". Perspectives of New Music 50, nos. 1 & 2 (Winter–Summer): 306–312.
 Kovács, Adorján F. 2012. "Das Publikum als Teil der Inszenierung: Mittwoch aus Licht von Karlheinz Stockhausen". MusikTexte, no. 135:85–86.
 Maconie, Robin. 2005. Other Planets: The Music of Karlheinz Stockhausen. Lanham, Maryland, Toronto, Oxford: The Scarecrow Press. .
 Maconie, Robin. 2013. "Divine Comedy: Stockhausen's Mittwoch in Birmingham". Tempo 67, no. 263 (January): 2–18.
 Maconie, Robin. 2016. Other Planets: The Complete Works of Karlheinz Stockhausen 1950–2007, updated edition. Lanham, Maryland, and London: Rowman & Littlefield. .
 McCormick, Neil. 2012. "Stockhausen's Mittwoch aus Licht: Opera with Real Altitude". The Telegraph (21 August) (accessed 14 September 2012).
 Minguet, Vicent. 2012. "Mittwoch aus Licht, Karlheinz Stockhausen: Intèrprets: Birmingham Opera Company Orchestra, London Voices, Ex Cathedra, Elysian Quartet; Direcció escènica: Graham Vick, Direcció Musical: Kathinka Pasveer: Birmingham Opera Company, 22 d'agost". Sonograma Magazine (31 August) (Accessed 2 September 2012).
 Oehlschlägel, Reinhard. 1998. "In lichten Höhen: Das Helikopter-Streichquartett von Karlheinz Stockhausen". Positionen: Beiträge zur Neuen Musik, no. 34 (February): 42–43.
 Parsons, Ian Lawrence. 2019. "The Phenomenology of Light: an Interpretation of Stockhausen's Opera Cycle Drawing on Heidegger's Fourfold and Lacanian Psychoanalysis". Ph.D. diss. Melbourne: Monash University.
 Petridis, Alexis. 2012. "The Last Unperformed Stockhausen Opera Lifts Off". The Guardian (8 August) (accessed 14 September 2012).
 Quantrill, Peter. 2012. "Helicopters and Camels: Stockhausen Mittwoch aus Licht Gets Staged Premiere 15 Years On: Birmingham Opera Company Gives Embracing and Euphoric Performance". Gramophone (28 August).
 Ross, Alex. 2012. "Opera in the Clouds: Avant-Garde Spectacles by Stockhausen and Cage". The New Yorker (10 September): 104–105.
 Rubens, Taurus. 2004. "Theater für Flugzeuge". Kultura-Extra: Das Online Magazin (October).
 Sannikova, Natal'â Vladimirovna. 2008. "Model' opernogo spektaklâ K. Štokhauzena: Voprosy realizacii v opere Sreda iz cikla Svet" [The Operatic Model of Karlheinz Stockhausen: Issues of Realization in the Opera Mittwoch from the Cycle Licht]. Muzykovedenie, no. 3:40–45.
 Schlüren, Christoph. 1998. "Space-Brimborium neontöniger Erleuchtung: Stockhausens Michaelion in der Musica viva uraufgeführt". Frankfurter Rundschau (Archive from 20 December 2014, accessed 23 July 2018).
 Schwarz, Gisela. 2012a. "Mal ernst, mal verspielt". Kölner Stadt-Anzeiger (24 August) (accessed 1 September 2012).
 Shimizu, Minoru. 2004. "Potentiale multimedialer Aufführung und 'szenische Musik'—einige Bemerkungen zum Helikopter-Streichquartett." In Internationales Stockhausen-Symposion 2000: LICHT. Musikwissenschaftliches Institut der Universität zu Köln, 19. bis 22. Oktober 2000. Tagungsbericht, edited by Imke Misch and Christoph von Blumröder, 61–73. Münster, Berlin, London: LIT-Verlag.
 Simons, Marlise. 1995. "A Helicopter Quartet. What Else?". The New York Times (31 July).
 Spahn, Claus. 2007. "Abheben in Braunschweig". Die Zeit, no. 26 (21 June): 50.
 Stockhausen, Karlheinz. 1989a. Texte zur Musik, vol. 5, edited by Christoph von Blumröder. DuMont Dokumente. Cologne: DuMont Buchverlag. .
 Stockhausen, Karlheinz. 1996b. "Helikopter-Streichquartett". Grand Street 14, no. 4 (Spring, "Grand Street 56: Dreams"): 213–225. . Online variant version [1999], as "Introduction: HELICOPTER STRING QUARTET (1992/93)" (some omissions, some supplements, different illustrations).
 Stockhausen, Karlheinz. 1996c. Trumpetent/Trompetent: für 4 Trompeter, Werk Nr. 73. Kürten: Stockhausen-Verlag.
 Stockhausen, Karlheinz. 1999a. Helikopter-Streichquartett, booklet for the Stockhausen Complete Edition CD 53.
 Stockhausen, Karlheinz. 1999b. Orchester-Finalisten (vom Mittwoch aus Licht). Werk Nr. 68. Kürten: Stockhausen-Verlag.
 Stockhausen, Karlheinz. 2000. Helikopter-Streichquartett: für Streichquartett, 4 Helikopter mit Piloten und 4 Tontechnikern, 4 Fernseh-Sender, 4 x 3 Ton-Sender, Auditorium mit 4 Fernseh Säulen und 4 Lautsprecher-Säulen, Klangregisseur mit Mischpult, Moderator (ad lib.): 3. Szene vom Mittwoch aus Licht (1992/1993), Werk Nr. 69. Kürten: Stockhausen-Verlag.
 Stockhausen, Karlheinz. 2003. Mittwochs-Gruss: elektronische Musik vom Mittwoch aus Licht: Aufführung mit 4-Spur-Tonband (1998) Werk Nr. 65. Kürten: Stockhausen-Verlag.
 Stockhausen, Karlheinz. 2004. "Helikopter-Streichquartett: Eine 8-Spur-Tonbandaufführung mit Erläuterungen." In Internationales Stockhausen-Symposion 2000: LICHT. Musikwissenschaftliches Institut der Universität zu Köln, 19. bis 22. Oktober 2000. Tagungsbericht, edited by Imke Misch and Christoph von Blumröder, 89–114. Münster, Berlin, London: LIT-Verlag.
 Stockhausen, Karlheinz, and Reinhard Ermen. 2012. "Karlheinz Stockhausen im Gespräch mit Reinhard Ermen über MITTWOCH aus LICHT" / "Karlheinz Stockhausen Talks with Reinhard Ermen about WEDNESDAY from LIGHT". In Karlheinz Stockhausen, Mittwoch aus Licht: Uraufführung (programme book), 57–65, 103–111. Kürten: Stockhausen-Stiftung für Musik.
 Thiemann, Albrecht. 2012. "Luftgeister mit Luzikamel: Olympia seis Dank: Mittwoch aus Licht und ein Stockhausen-Symposium in Birmingham". Opernwelt (November): 55–58.
 Toop, Richard. 2005. Six Lectures from the Stockhausen Courses Kürten 2002. Kürten: Stockhausen-Verlag. .
 Toop, Richard. 2008. "Mittwoch aus Licht ('Wednesday from Light')". Grove Music Online: The New Grove Dictionary of Opera (22 October) (Subscription access) (accessed 17 April 2013).
 Toronyi-Lalic, Igor. 2012. "Mittwoch aus Licht, Birmingham Opera Company". The Arts Desk (23 August).
 Ulrich, Thomas. 2004. "Moral und Übermoral in Stockhausens Licht".In Internationales Stockhausen-Symposion 2000: LICHT. Musikwissenschaftliches Institut der Universität zu Köln, 19. bis 22. Oktober 2000. Tagungsbericht, edited by Imke Misch and Christoph von Blumröder, 74–88. Münster: Lit-Verlag. .
 Ulrich, Thomas. 2008. "Anmerkungen zu Luzifer". In Gedenkschrift für Stockhausen, edited by Suzanne Stephens and Kathinka Pasveer, 202–211. Kürten: Stockhausen-Stiftung für Musik. .
 Ulrich, Thomas. 2012a. "Lucifer and Morality in Stockhausen's Opera Cycle Licht", translated by Jerome Kohl from Ulrich 2004 and 2008. Perspectives of New Music 50, nos. 1 & 2 (Winter–Summer): 313–341.
 Ulrich, Thomas. 2012b. Stockhausen: A Theological Interpretation, translated by Jayne Obst. Kürten: Stockhausen-Stiftung für Musik. .
 Ulrich, Thomas. 2017. Stockhausens Zyklus LICHT: Ein Opernführer. Cologne, Weimar, and Vienna: Böhlau Verlag. .
 Voermans, Erik. 1996. "Stockhausen is blij met Asko Ensemble". Het Parool (13 June).

External links

Geyer, Elke. 2009. "Stockhausens Helikopter-Streichquartett: Ein aufwendiges Werk für vier Hubschrauber, Musiker und Techniker" (record review). Suite101.de: Das Netzwerk der Autoren (3 October). (Archive from 6 May 2013, accessed 23 July 2018.) 

Operas by Karlheinz Stockhausen
20th-century classical music
Operas
1997 operas
2012 operas
Multiple-language operas
Electronic compositions
Music dedicated to causes or groups
Serial compositions
Spatial music
Science fiction operas
Operas set in fictional, mythological and folkloric settings